Melkefoss power station is a hydro electric dam on the Paatsjoki river in the Sør-Varanger municipality in Finnmark, Norway.

The power station, which is owned by Pasvik Kraft, makes use of a fall of 10 meters in the river. Although the power station is located on a river, Lake Inari is regulated as storage for all of the power stations in the drainage basin. The dam has one installed Kaplan turbine, yielding 26 Megawatts. Mean yearly production at the dam is 129 Gigawatt hours.

See also

Sources
NVE
Varanger kraft

Hydroelectric power stations in Norway